In computer science, an evolution strategy (ES) is an optimization technique based on ideas of evolution. It belongs to the general class of evolutionary computation or artificial evolution methodologies.

History
The 'evolution strategy' optimization technique was created in the early 1960s and developed further in the 1970s and later by Ingo Rechenberg, Hans-Paul Schwefel and their co-workers.

Methods
Evolution strategies use natural problem-dependent representations, and primarily mutation and selection, as search operators. In common with evolutionary algorithms, the operators are applied in a loop. An iteration of the loop is called a generation. The sequence of generations is continued until a termination criterion is met.

For real-valued search spaces, mutation is performed by adding a normally distributed random vector. 
The step size or mutation strength (i.e. the standard deviation of the normal distribution) is often governed by self-adaptation (see evolution window). Individual step sizes for each coordinate, or correlations between coordinates, which are essentially defined by an underlying covariance matrix, are controlled in practice either by self-adaptation or by covariance matrix adaptation (CMA-ES). When the mutation step is drawn from a multivariate normal distribution using an evolving covariance matrix, it has been hypothesized that this adapted matrix approximates the inverse Hessian of the search landscape. This hypothesis has been proven for a static model relying on a quadratic approximation.

The (environmental) selection in evolution strategies is deterministic and only based on the fitness rankings, not on the actual fitness values. The resulting algorithm is therefore invariant with respect to monotonic transformations of the objective function. The simplest evolution strategy operates on a population of size two: the current point (parent) and the result of its mutation. Only if the mutant's fitness is at least as good as the parent one, it becomes the parent of the next generation. Otherwise the mutant is disregarded. This is a (1 + 1)-ES. More generally, λ mutants can be generated and compete with the parent, called (1 + λ)-ES. In (1 , λ)-ES the best mutant becomes the parent of the next generation while the current parent is always disregarded. For some of these variants, proofs of linear convergence (in a stochastic sense) have been derived on unimodal objective functions.

Contemporary derivatives of evolution strategy often use a population of μ parents and recombination as an additional operator, called (μ/ρ+, λ)-ES. This makes them less prone to settle in local optima.

See also

 Covariance matrix adaptation evolution strategy (CMA-ES)
 Derivative-free optimization
 Evolutionary computation
 Genetic algorithm
 Natural evolution strategy
 Evolutionary game theory

References

Bibliography

 Ingo Rechenberg (1971): Evolutionsstrategie – Optimierung technischer Systeme nach Prinzipien der biologischen Evolution (PhD thesis). Reprinted by Frommann-Holzboog (1973).
 Hans-Paul Schwefel (1974): Numerische Optimierung von Computer-Modellen (PhD thesis). Reprinted by Birkhäuser (1977).
 H.-G. Beyer and H.-P. Schwefel. Evolution Strategies: A Comprehensive Introduction. Journal Natural Computing, 1(1):3–52, 2002.
 Hans-Georg Beyer: The Theory of Evolution Strategies: Springer April 27, 2001.
 Hans-Paul Schwefel: Evolution and Optimum Seeking: New York: Wiley & Sons 1995.
 Ingo Rechenberg: Evolutionsstrategie '94. Stuttgart: Frommann-Holzboog 1994.
 J. Klockgether and H. P. Schwefel (1970). Two-Phase Nozzle And Hollow Core Jet Experiments. AEG-Forschungsinstitut. MDH Staustrahlrohr Project Group. Berlin, Federal Republic of Germany. Proceedings of the 11th Symposium on Engineering Aspects of Magneto-Hydrodynamics, Caltech, Pasadena, Cal., 24.–26.3. 1970.
 M. Emmerich, O.M. Shir, and H. Wang: Evolution Strategies. In: Handbook of Heuristics, 1-31. Springer International Publishing (2018).

Research centers
 Bionics & Evolutiontechnique at the Technical University Berlin
 Chair of Algorithm Engineering (Ls11) – University of Dortmund
 Collaborative Research Center 531 – University of Dortmund

Evolutionary algorithms